Descanso is a genus of jumping spiders that was first described by George and Elizabeth Peckham in 1892. The name is derived from Spanish descanso, meaning "resting place (of a dead person)", from the verb descansar "to (have a) rest."

Species
 it contains ten species, found in Colombia, Peru, Brazil, Panama, and on Hispaniola:
Descanso chapoda Peckham & Peckham, 1892 – Brazil
Descanso discicollis (Taczanowski, 1878) – Peru
Descanso formosus Bryant, 1943 – Hispaniola
Descanso insolitus Chickering, 1946 – Panama
Descanso magnus Bryant, 1943 – Hispaniola
Descanso montanus Bryant, 1943 – Hispaniola
Descanso peregrinus Chickering, 1946 – Panama, Colombia
Descanso sobrius Galiano, 1986 – Brazil
Descanso vagus Peckham & Peckham, 1892 (type) – Brazil
Descanso ventrosus Galiano, 1986 – Brazil

References

Salticidae genera
Fauna of Hispaniola
Salticidae
Spiders of Central America
Spiders of South America
Spiders of the Caribbean
Arthropods of the Dominican Republic